"Starting Today" is a 1961 song by Elvis Presley.

Writing 
The song was written by Don Robertson.

Recording 
Elvis Presley recorded "Starting Today" during his March 12/13, 1961 recording session at the RCA Studios in Nashville, Tennessee.

It was recorded on a 3-track. According to Don Reedman, who with Nick Patrick produced the 2015 album The Wonder of You: Elvis Presley with the Royal Philharmonic Orchestra, "[Presley's] original recording is very simple, very sparse".

Release history 
The song "Starting Today" was first released on Presley's album Something for Everybody, put out on June 17, 1961.

In 2016 the song appeared on the album The Wonder of You: Elvis Presley with the Royal Philharmonic Orchestra, which included new versions of Presley's songs, remixed and dubbed with the Royal Philharmonic Orchestra.

References

External links 
 

1961 songs
Elvis Presley songs
Songs written by Don Robertson (songwriter)